Ghosts are believed to be wandering souls and are thought by Vietnamese people to affect their daily lives. Many of the beliefs and practices surrounding ghosts parallel those held in relations to ancestor worship.

Key terms
Ghosts in Vietnam are known by the following names: ma, hồn, vong, hồn ma, bóng ma, linh hồn, vong hồn, oan hồn, bách linh, yêu quái.

Vietnamese beliefs in ghosts
Ghosts in Vietnam are known to take on many forms and do not fit into one category. They can be "pleasant and feared, harmless and dangerous, moral creatures and unhappy suicides, male and female, human and un-human". It is generally understood that certain ghosts are people who have undergone unnatural, premature, painful or violent deaths, and especially when people die away from home. This differs from the understanding of ancestors who would have died a good death in their homes with the proper rituals in place.
The souls in Vietnam are understood to need certain items in the afterlife in order to function, just like the living. These include offerings of paper money, food, clothing, shoes, a house, a bicycle Souls that receive the proper rituals, are buried in a good location with a proper tombstone, and have their tablet installed on the family's ancestor altar will become ancestors, will be nourished by the family, and will reciprocate by continuing to help the family and its members prosper. Those who don't will become ghosts, and are thought to roam the countryside in hoards stealing what they can along the way. In this sense, they are seen as the supernatural equivalent of robbers. They are, therefore, also called "hungry ghosts" (ma đói).

There are many ghost stories, "chuyện ma", which relate to the manner in which ghosts haunt the people of Vietnam. Ghosts are present in turns in the roads where car accidents occur on a regular basis. There is a general understanding that it is at these places that ghosts pop out in front of the cars causing them to go off the road or hit oncoming cars.

Ghosts are also viewed as aids to fortune-tellers and spirit mediums because they help them to gain an understanding about people's lives. Vietnamese will visit spirit mediums and fortune tellers in order to gain insight into their finances or love life. Spirit Mediums also aid in the locating dead relatives who have not received proper burials.

The beliefs in ghosts have affected how the Vietnamese deal with MIA soldiers. The Vietnam War caused many soldiers not to return home, as well as not receiving proper burials in their home communities. The graves of the unknown mark the landscape of Vietnam and can be found on footpaths, in family gardens and in fields. Many remain unmarked. As a result, ghosts of the soldiers are said to wander these areas. There is now a great desire to discover where the remains of the deceased are located and to bring them home to their villages for reburial.

However, the Communist government of Vietnam views beliefs in ghosts as culturally backward and morally lax. Ghost stories in the media and commemoration rituals are discouraged.

Famous incidences

One of the most famous is of  Phung Itlem, a Buddhist who burned herself to death 1949, she is said to be the inspiration for the famous burning monk seen in the treatment of the Buddhist community during the 1960s in Vietnam. He is primarily remembered for a photograph taken 50 years ago on June 11, 1963, depicting the dignified yet horrific death by fiery suicide of Buddhist monk Thich Quang Duc.

The rumour of the Ghost Monk is that she burned herself in protest outside the Presidential Palace in Saigon in 1939 to protest the death of her superior at the hands of the French Colonial Government. Pictured below is Phung in 1919 at the Tu Hieu pagoda in Hue. - Secret police keep watch at the pagoda in Vietnam where Zen master Thich Nhat Hanh, whose teachings on mindfulness grew into a popular movement in Vietnam.

Whilst still burning she ran the length of the Le Duan street in a desperate effort to reach the river but was overcome just a few meters from the bank which is now known as Saigon Zoo. There have been sighting of her walking the park in her traditional robes and accounts of a monk in the animals enclosures but no trace is ever found of interaction with anyone.

Practices
Spirit mediums will be used by families looking for their loved ones as well as ghosts looking for their families. There is a strong desire to find missing people; so that they may have a good resting place where the family can make offerings to the deceased. There is an idea that ghosts and their families cannot be at peace with the person's death until they are found and have a proper burial and grave. Over the last number of years many remains of dead soldiers have been found. The bodies are then exhumed, and reburied in their home communities. Often there are formal military funerals where the soldiers are given full military honour because they are considered martyrs.

One of the most common rituals/practices for dealing with ghosts is to burn incense and offer prayers. This is done for the various unknown ghosts who have been seen or are thought to be buried in the area. This would happen whenever a villager passed by the locations of ghost sightings. Although this is one of the most common rituals for dealing with ghost, it is not always effective. Another methods for dealing with a ghost is to bring in a ritual specialist recite incantations, cau chu, in order to make the ghost leave.

Before many rituals offerings of sticky rice will be made to hungry ghosts to prevent them from interfering. This practice of making offerings to hungry ghosts is also common at funerals, so that the offerings are not stolen by ghosts.

See also
Chinese ghost
Muoi: The Legend of a Portrait (film)
Onryō
Vengeful ghost

Notes

References

External links
Blog covers American jet pilot's wandering soul Buddhist ceremony, by Viet Cong soldier in Que Son Mtns

Vietnamese legendary creatures